A concatenative programming language is a point-free computer programming language in which all expressions denote functions, and the juxtaposition of expressions denotes function composition. Concatenative programming replaces function application, which is common in other programming styles, with function composition as the default way to build subroutines.

Example
For example, a sequence of operations in an applicative language like the following:

y = foo(x)
z = bar(y)
w = baz(z)

...is written in a concatenative language as a sequence of functions:

 x foo bar baz

Functions and procedures written in concatenative style are not value level, i.e. they typically do not represent the data structures they operate on with explicit names or identifiers. Instead they are function levela function is defined as a pipeline, or a sequence of operations that take parameters from an implicit data structure upon which all functions operate, and return the function results to that shared structure so that it will be used by the next operator.

The combination of compositional semantics with a syntax that mirrors such a semantic makes concatenative languages highly amenable to algebraic manipulation of programs; although it may be difficult to write mathematical expressions directly in them. Concatenative languages can be implemented efficiently with a stack machine, and are commonly present implicitly in virtual machines in the form of their instruction sets.

Properties
The properties of concatenative languages are the result of their compositional syntax and semantics:

 The reduction of any expression is the simplification of one function to another function; it is never necessary to deal with the application of functions to objects.
 Any subexpression can be replaced with a name that represents the same subexpression. This is referred to in the concatenative community as factoring and is used extensively to simplify programs into smaller parts.
 The syntax and semantics of concatenative languages form the algebraic structure of a monoid.
 Concatenative languages can be made well-suited to an implementation inspired by linear logic where no garbage is ever generated.

Implementations
The first concatenative programming language was Forth, although Joy was the first language to call itself concatenative. Other concatenative languages are dc, Factor, Onyx, PostScript, and RPL.

Most existing concatenative languages are stack-based; this is not a requirement and other models have been proposed. Concatenative languages are currently used for embedded, desktop, and web programming, as target languages, and for research purposes.

Most concatenative languages are dynamically typed. Exceptions include the statically typed Cat language.

See also
 Function-level programming
 Homoiconicity
 Stack-oriented programming language
 Tacit programming

References

External links
 concatenative.org: A wiki about concatenative languages
 Staapl: Forth on Scheme for Embedded Controllers
 The Enchilada Programming Language
 The Concatenative Language XY
 The Om Programming Language